The Bedbug is a play by Vladimir Mayakovsky written in 1928-1929 and published originally by Molodaya Gvardiya magazine (Nos. 3 and 4, 1929), then, as a book, by Gosizdat in 1929. "The faerie comedy in nine pictures", lampooning the type of philistine that emerged with the New Economic Policy in the Soviet Union, was premiered in February 1929 at the Meyerhold Theatre with designs by Alexander Rodchenko. Received warmly by the audiences, it caused controversy and received harsh treatment in the Soviet press. Unlike its follow-up, The Bathhouse (denounced as ideologically deficient), The Bedbug was criticised mostly for its alleged 'aesthetic faults'.

Plot
The action of the play begins in 1929 in the U.S.S.R.  Ivan Prisypkin is a young man in the age of NEP.  On the day of his wedding to Elzevir Davidovna Renaissance, Prisypkin is frozen in a basement.  After fifty years, he is revived in a world that looks very different.  Around him is an ideal communist world, almost a utopia.  There is no more poverty and destitution, illness and natural disasters have been defeated, and people have forgotten about drunkenness, smoking, and swearing.  Prisypkin does not belong in this future.  He becomes an exhibit at the zoo and serves as an example of the vices of a past age to the citizens of the future.  The title of the play comes from a bed bug which was frozen at the same time as Prisypkin and becomes his companion.

Characters
 Ivan Prisypkin (Pierre Skripkin) - former worker, former party member, fiancé of Elzevir
 Zoya Beryozkina - worker
 Oleg Bard - landlord
 Elzevir Davidovna Renaissance - Prisypkin's fiancée, manicurist, cashier at hair salon
 Rosalie Pavlovna Renaissance - mother of Elzevir
 David Osipovich Renaissance - father of Elzevir
 Usher at wedding
 Professor
 Director of the Zoo
 Chairman of the City Council
 Fire Warden
 Orator
 Workers, Reporters, Crowd, Hunters, Students, Attendants, Firemen

Production
Vsevolod Meyerhold directed the production of The Bedbug at the Meyerhold Theatre, which was preceded by a reading by Mayakovsky.  Incidental music was composed by Dmitri Shostakovich, who later published a suite of extracts as Op. 19a. The play was recognized as "a significant phenomenon of Soviet drama," called "the Soviet Auditor" and offered a place in the repertoire.  The play had been performed publicly for three years.

References 

1929 plays
Russian plays
Plays by Vladimir Mayakovsky